The Queen's Award for Enterprise: Innovation (Technology) (1980) was awarded on 21 April 1980, by Queen Elizabeth II.

Recipients
The following organisations were awarded this year.

  Analytical Instruments Ltd of Cambridge for explosives detecting doorway (ENTRY-SCAN).
  Cape Boards and Panels, Ltd of Uxbridge, Middlesex for asbestos-free, fire resistant boards.
  DJB Engineering Ltd of Peterlee, Co. Durham for articulated dump trucks.
 Ferranti Electronics Ltd of Chadderton, Oldham, Greater Manchester for uncommitted logic arrays for microelectronics applications.
 Matthew Hall Engineering Ltd of London, W1 for design of production facilities for Claymore " A" Platform.
 The Semiconductors Division of ITT Industries Ltd of Foots-Cray, Sidcup, Kent for random access memories.
 Linotype-Paul Ltd of Cheltenham, Gloucestershire for their digital phototypesetter.
 Lion Laboratories Ltd of Cardiff, South Glamorgan for analytical instruments using fuel cell sensors.
 Micro Consultants Ltd of Caterham, Surrey for electronic video image processing systems (INTELLECT).
 Monotype International Ltd of Salfords, Redhill, Surrey for laser-driven optical system for phototypesetting.
 Morgan Refractories Ltd of Neston, South Wirral, Cheshire for refractory protection (INSULOQ).
 National Semiconductor (UK) Ltd of Greenock, Renfrewshire for integrated circuit for Dolby " B " type noise reduction.
 Oxford Instruments Ltd of Osney Mead, Oxford for superconducting magnet systems for nuclear magnetic resonance spectroscopy.
 Racal Safety Ltd of Wembley, Middlesex for ventilated helmet giving protection against nuisance dusts, combined with head and eye/face protection.
 Renishaw Electrical Ltd of Wotton-under-Edge, Gloucestershire for  probes for use in measuring equipment and machine tools.
 Rothamsted Experimental Station of Harpenden, Hertfordshire for photostable synthetic pyrethroids.
 The Howson-Algraphy Group of Vickers Ltd of Leeds, West Yorkshire for lithographic printing.

See also
 The Queen's Award for Enterprise: International Trade (Export) (1980)

References

Queen's Award for Enterprise: Innovation (Technology)
1980 in the United Kingdom